Haiti–Taiwan relations or ROC–Haitian relations refer to the bilateral relations between the Republic of Haiti and Republic of China (Taiwan). Haiti maintains an embassy in Taipei and Taiwan maintains an embassy in Port-au-Prince.

History
Haiti recognized the Republic of China (ROC) over the People's Republic of China (PRC) in 1956 as the sole sovereign power of "China" and have since maintained formal diplomatic relations with the ROC.

Haiti is one of 14 nations that recognize the ROC officially. The Sino-Haitian Treaty of Amity was signed on February 15, 1966.

In 2018, Dominican Republic choose to recognize the PRC over ROC, culminating in increased interest in Haiti among Taiwanese and Chinese governments. In 1993, the PRC opened a commercial office in Haiti in a bid to start the process of formalizing diplomatic relations however it did not come to fruition. The ROC, in a bid to maintain relations, has offered US$150 million to Haiti for development of rural power grids, following the destruction of much of the infrastructure in the 2010 Haiti earthquake.

Bilateral visits
On 28 May 2018, Haitian President Jovenel Moise visited Taiwan following the announcement of the Dominican Republic severing ties with Taiwan. Tsai Ing-wen and Moise discussed developmental aid for Haiti and maintaining relations with Tsai stating “Even though Taiwan and Haiti are separated by large geographic distance, both share democratic and freedom values. In many areas, both sides have seen the results of the long-term and deep partnership".

See also
Foreign relations of Haiti
Foreign relations of Taiwan

References

 
Taiwan
Bilateral relations of Taiwan